Paul Alexandru Iacob (born 21 June 1996) is a Romanian professional footballer who plays as a defensive midfielder or a centre-back for Liga I club Rapid București.

In the past he represented Viitorul Constanța, Gaz Metan Mediaș, Brașov, ASA Târgu Mureș, Dunărea Călărași and Chindia Târgoviște.

Career statistics

Club

Honours
Gaz Metan Mediaș
Liga II: 2015–16

Dunărea Călărași
Liga II: 2017–18

Viitorul Constanța
Cupa României: 2018–19
Supercupa României: 2019

References

External links

Paul Iacob at Liga Profesionistă de Fotbal 

1996 births
Living people
Sportspeople from Constanța
Romanian footballers
Association football midfielders
Liga I players
FC Viitorul Constanța players
AFC Chindia Târgoviște players
FC Rapid București players
Liga II players
CS Gaz Metan Mediaș players
FC Brașov (1936) players
ASA 2013 Târgu Mureș players
FC Dunărea Călărași players